The Iliboleng is a stratovolcano located at the southeast end of Adonara Island in Flores in Indonesia.

The top of the volcano was created by several summit craters. The first eruption was recorded in 1885. The activity is classified as moderate.

See also 
 List of volcanoes in Indonesia

External links
 

Stratovolcanoes of Indonesia
Subduction volcanoes
Active volcanoes of Indonesia
Mountains of Flores Island (Indonesia)
Volcanoes of the Lesser Sunda Islands
Holocene stratovolcanoes